Fuchsia loxensis is a species of fuchsia in the family Onagraceae. It is endemic to Ecuador.

References

Flora of Ecuador
loxensis
Least concern plants
Taxonomy articles created by Polbot